Tregoweth Edmond "Treg" Brown (November 4, 1899 – April 28, 1984) was an American motion picture sound editor who was responsible for the sound effects in Warner Bros.' Looney Tunes and Merrie Melodies cartoons from 1936 to 1963.  Before that, he worked with Cecil B. DeMille. Adding to this, he also gave fellow Warner Bros voice actor Mel Blanc his big break. He also won the 1966 Academy Award for Sound Effects for his work on the film The Great Race.

In the Warner Bros. cartoon One Froggy Evening (1955), the skyscraper into which Michigan J. Frog is entombed is named the "Tregoweth Brown Building".

Filmography
The Bugs n' Daffy Show
Devil May Hare
Zip Zip Hooray!
Freudy Cat
Dr. Devil and Mr. Hare
One Froggy Evening
Now Hear This

References

External links

 

1899 births
1984 deaths
American sound editors
Best Sound Editing Academy Award winners
People from Gilbert, Minnesota
Warner Bros. Cartoons people